Cytosolic non-specific dipeptidase also known as carnosine dipeptidase 2 is an enzyme that in humans is encoded by the CNDP2 gene. This enzyme catalyses the following chemical reaction

 Hydrolysis of dipeptides, preferentially hydrophobic dipeptides including prolyl amino acids

This zinc enzyme has broad specificity.

Nomenclature 
Cytosolic non-specific dipeptidase is also known as

 N2-beta-alanylarginine dipeptidase
 glycyl-glycine dipeptidase
 glycyl-leucine dipeptidase
 iminodipeptidase
 peptidase A
 Pro-X dipeptidase
 prolinase
 prolyl dipeptidase
 prolylglycine dipeptidase
 L-prolylglycine dipeptidase
 diglycinase
 Gly-Leu hydrolase
 glycyl-L-leucine dipeptidase
 glycyl-L-leucine hydrolase
 glycyl-L-leucine peptidase
 L-amino-acyl-L-amino-acid hydrolase
 glycylleucine peptidase
 glycylleucine hydrolase
 glycylleucine dipeptide hydrolase
 non-specific dipeptidase
 human cytosolic non-specific dipeptidase

Dipeptidase is a type of peptidase, which is a type of hydrolase. Other term with the suffix -ase denotes enzymes acting on the substrate with the suffix.
Beta-alanyl is an acyl group derived from beta-alanine.
N2-beta-alanylarginine is a dipeptide of beta-alanine and arginine.
Glycyl is an acyl group derived from glycine.
Glycyl-glycine or diglycine is a dipeptide of two glycine (Gly) molecules.
Glycyl-leucine, glycylleucine, glycyl-L-leucine, or Gly-Leu is a dipeptide of glycine and leucine (Leu).
Prolyl is an acyl group derived from proline (Pro). Pro-X is a dipeptide of proline and another amino acid. Prolylglycine, or L-prolylglycine is a dipeptide of proline and glycine (Pro-Gly, included in Pro-X).

See also 
 N-lactoyl-phenylalanine, a chemical compound produced by this enzyme

References

External links 
 

EC 3.4.13